Tobias Svendsen Foss (born 25 May 1997 in Vingrom) is a Norwegian cyclist, who currently rides for UCI WorldTeam .

Career
In July 2019, it was announced that Foss would join UCI WorldTeam  on a two-year contract from 2020. In August 2019, Foss became the first Norwegian to win the Tour de l'Avenir. In October 2020, he was named in the startlist for the 2020 Giro d'Italia. In 2021 he won the National Championships in the road race and time trial and once again rode the Giro where he placed in the top 10.

In 2022, he won a shocking victory in the time trial at the UCI Road World Championships in Wollongong, beating out favorites including Stefan Küng, Remco Evenepoel and Filippo Ganna. This also made him the first ever Norwegian to win the title.

Major results

2014
 National Junior Road Championships
1st  Team time trial
2nd Time trial
2nd Criterium
3rd Road race
 3rd  Time trial, UEC European Junior Road Championships
2015
 National Junior Road Championships
1st  Road race
1st  Time trial
1st  Team time trial
 2nd  Time trial, UEC European Junior Road Championships
 8th Time trial, UCI Junior Road World Championships
2016
 1st  Time trial, National Under-23 Road Championships
 3rd Overall ZLM Tour
1st Stage 1 (TTT)
 4th Himmerland Rundt
2017
 1st  Young rider classification, Tour of Norway
 7th Overall Tour de l'Avenir
2018
 4th Time trial, National Road Championships
 6th Time trial, UCI Road World Under-23 Championships
 6th Overall Okolo Slovenska
1st  Young rider classification
 8th Hafjell GP
 9th Overall Tour de l'Avenir
 10th Piccolo Giro di Lombardia
2019
 1st  Overall Tour de l'Avenir
 3rd Liège–Bastogne–Liège Espoirs
 4th Overall Volta ao Alentejo
1st  Young rider classification
 4th Overall Le Triptyque des Monts et Châteaux
 4th Hafjell GP
 6th Road race, UCI Road World Under-23 Championships
 7th Kattekoers
2020
 2nd Time trial, National Road Championships
 5th Overall Tour de Hongrie
2021
 National Road Championships
1st  Road race
1st  Time trial
 9th Overall Giro d'Italia
2022
1st  Time trial, UCI Road World Championships
 1st  Time trial, National Road Championships
 2nd Chrono des Nations
 6th Overall Volta ao Algarve
2023
 1st Stage 3 (TTT) Paris–Nice
 4th Overall Volta ao Algarve

Grand Tour general classification results timeline

Major championships timeline

References

External links

 
 
 
 
 
 
 
 

1997 births
Living people
Norwegian male cyclists
Sportspeople from Lillehammer
Olympic cyclists of Norway
Cyclists at the 2020 Summer Olympics
UCI Road World Champions (elite men)